Oleg Kharch /Kharchenko (born 1963 in Sumy) is a Ukrainian visual and sound artist working in the figurative, new Ukrainian naive (Quasi- naive), post-conceptual direction in the ultra contemporary art movement "#BULLBASKA".

His works ranges from street art projects, sound sculptures and video collage to traditional painting.
From December 2018-19 - a member of the "Hlebzawod". Founder and member of the Open’o’Pen $ group of artists since 2020. From October 2021 he declared himself exclusively as an artist New Brut Art.
Together with his wife (Olga Shuvalova), Oleg Kharch Group was established in 2016.

Education and personal life

From 1980-85 he was a student of the Faculty of Building Technology in Dnipro (ex-Dnepropetrovsk) Construction Engineering Institute, and during 1981–83 he attended the art studio of Stanislav Cherevko, Dnepropetrovsk.

1981 -83 studied in art studio of Stanislav Cherevko/ Dnipro (ex-Dnepropetrovsk)/ USSR.
1985 -87 junior sergeant, squad leader of armored vehicles Repair in the Soviet Army.
Since December 2018 he has been a participant of "Hlebzawod".

Kharch is a resident of Kyiv, Ukraine.

Publications
 2015 Ukraine: Short Stories about Contemporary Artists from Ukraine, Luciano Benetton, Italy
 2019 The book of the artist. "Chronicles of the unpublished (hybrid) war. Or Cotton Accounting, from Oleg Kharch

2019 Kyiv Art Week 2019 "Tries to Bring Ukraijne CLoser to the West", Text: Emmanuel Grynszpan, Beyond Russia, Contents № 8'' "Russian Art Focus"

Selected exhibitions
2021 -First Ukrainian Biennale of Digital and Media Art "30 Years of Freedom”. Valery Korshunov (Ukraine), Yuri Lech Polanski(Spain), curators. Artarea Gallery, Kyiv, Ukraine;
-“ Wellcome Elon Musk!”| Kmytiv Museum of Fine Arts named Y. D. Bukhanchuk/ Kmytiv, Zhytomyr region, Ukraine;
2020: Corona! Shut down!| international festival network @ New on NewMediaFest2020!, (Germany), curator – Wilfried Agricola de Cologne
"Cam Pandemic Art"| CAM_Casoria Contemporary Art Museum/ Naples, Italy, curator-Antonio Manfredi
 "The Environment of Existence. Manifest 2020"| Kyiv City Art Gallery Lavra / Kyiv, Ukraine, curator - Yulia Nuzhina
2019: Wake up! – Climate change!| international festival network @ The New Museum of Networked Art, Cologne (Germany), curator – Wilfried Agricola de Cologne
2019: Media Art Exhibition: Artefact: Chernobyl33/ River station/Kyiv, Ukraine
2019: Kyiv Art Week 2019| Art Fair "Hlebsawod"|23-26 May "Toronto - Kyiv" Complex
2019: The book of the artist. "Chronicles of the unpublished (hybrid) war. Or [Cotton Accounting], from Oleg Kharch"| Contemporary art center "Hlebzawod"/ Kyiv, Ukraine
2018: Hlebzawod Art Prize 2018| Contemporary art center "Hlebzawod"/ Kyiv, Ukraine
 Participate in “Creative Climate Awards 2018” ("CCAs2018"), of the Human Impacts Institute’s at the Taipei Economic and Cultural Office in New York, USA
2017: Participate in Art- Projekt– "Auto / Macht / Mobilität" /„Kunstpreis Worpswede“, Einbeck, Germany
 “Gogolfest 2017 Oleg Kharch”/ Visual Art ProgrammGogolfest, visual art, Kiyv, Ukraine
2017 5th Odessa Biennial "Turbulence Area"/ Gallery "Hudpromo", Odessa
2017 Semi- project Oleg Kharch& Volodymir Kharchenko/ "khARTchenko- No CONJUNCTURE promenade"
2016 Project of Contemporary Art "Event Horizon", curators- A. Soloviev, A. Lozhkina, S. Savchuk, Mysteckyi Arsenal, Kiyv
2016 Parallelismes/ The (Instead Undo VIII Tashkent Biennale of Contemporary Art "Pushing the boundaries, unite the world") / Uzbekistan
2016 Mashrou' Proletkult/ AUB Art Galleries/ Beirut, Lebanon.
2016 Freierfest / Odessa, Ukraine
2016 Goodбaй Хутiр Postмодерн / KZ Art Room/ Kyiv, Ukraine
2015 Manifesto / IV Biennale Contemporary/ Odessa, Ukraine
2014 Snailices or snails attack / Art Kyiv Contemporary IX/ MyGallery / Kyiv, Ukraine.
2014 Ukrainian Pictorial Exhibition / The Museum of Arts of Cherkasy region, Ukraine.
2014 International Art Projects "fame not fallen heroes" & "Fame Maydan Heroes", V.Akhunov (Uzbekistan) & O.Kharch (Ukraine)/ Grushevskiy str. Second Barricade/ Maydan Nezalezhnosti/ Hreshchatyk str. by KSGA, Kyiv, Ukraine.
2013 Such earnings / Mala Gallery of Mystetsky Arsenal art center/ Kyiv, Ukraine.
1991 Exhibition Folk-Applied Art of Poltava region, The Poltava Museum of Local Lore, Ukraine;
1989 Exhibition of Bergen in Kingdom Norway;
1988 Exhibition, Museum of Local Lore Murmansk ex-USSR;

Art residencies:
2019- Media Art Residence Carbon/”Artefact: Chernobyl 33"/Kyiv, Ukraine;
2015/2013 Private artistic residency in Cap-d'Ail, Provence-Alpes-Côte d'Azur, France;

Collections
Mystetsky Arsenal art center |Kyiv/ Ukraine
Human Impacts Institute’s (HII) in New York, USA
Luciano Benetton Collection, Italy
MyGallery Kyiv/Ukraine | London/UK
Private collections

References

1963 births
Living people
People from Sumy
Ukrainian artists